Fourth or the fourth may refer to: 

 the ordinal form of the number 4
 Fourth (album), by Soft Machine, 1971
 Fourth (angle), an ancient astronomical subdivision
 Fourth (music), a musical interval
 The Fourth (1972 film), a Soviet drama

See also
 
 
 1/4 (disambiguation)
 4 (disambiguation)
 The fourth part of the world (disambiguation)
 Forth (disambiguation)
 Quarter (disambiguation)
 Independence Day (United States), or The Fourth of July